Samuel Warden House is a historic home located at Mount Pleasant, Westmoreland County, Pennsylvania.  The house was built in 1886, and is a three-story, square brick dwelling in the Second Empire style, with Queen Anne and Eastlake style details. It has a mansard roof clad in octagonal, fishscale slate with dormer windows.

It was added to the National Register of Historic Places in 1995.

References

Houses on the National Register of Historic Places in Pennsylvania
Second Empire architecture in Pennsylvania
Houses completed in 1886
Houses in Westmoreland County, Pennsylvania
National Register of Historic Places in Westmoreland County, Pennsylvania